Mugguru Kodukulu is a 1988 Indian Telugu-language action drama film directed by Krishna. The film stars Krishna himself alongside his real-life children, Ramesh Babu and Mahesh Babu. Radha, and Sonam play the female leads  The film was produced by Ghattamaneni Nagarathnamma under the Padmalaya Studios banner. Music was composed by Chakravarthy.

Cast

Krishna as Phanindra
Ramesh Babu as Rajendra 
Mahesh Babu as Surendra 
Radha as Roja 
Sonam as Sobha Rani
Satyanarayana as Jooga Rao 
Allu Ramalingaiah as Meesala Pedda Venkata Rayudu 
Gummadi as Dharma Rao 
Murali Mohan as D.S.P. Mohan Kumar 
Nutan Prasad as Guru Murthy 
Giri Babu as Ranga Rao 
Kota Srinivasa Rao as Bhanu Murthy 
Annapoorna as Shanthamma 
Prabha as Vasundhara 
Chalapathi Rao as Chamche
Vinod as Kumar 
Malladi as Priest 
Eeswar Rao as Captain Srikanth 
Bhimeswara Rao
Master Shanmukha Srinivas as Young Phanindra
Master Rajesh as Young Rajendra 
Baby Priya as Dolly

Soundtrack

Music was composed by Chakravarthy. Lyrics were written by Veturi. Music released on LEO Audio Company.

References

Indian action drama films
Films scored by K. Chakravarthy
1980s action drama films
1980s Telugu-language films